Zophobas is a genus of beetles in the family Tenebrionidae, the darkling beetles. In Cuba beetles of this genus are known as blind click-beetles.

Perhaps the best known species is Zophobas morio, a beetle whose larvae are robust mealworms sold as food for pets such as lizards. The larvae are known commonly as "superworms".

Zophobas atratus is also used as pet food, sold in pet stores under the name "giant mealworms", but should not be confused with darkling beetle mealworms sprayed with juvenile hormone. Studies have found that in the wild the larvae sometimes live in bat guano, and they tend to cannibalize the pupae of their own species. Researchers have discovered that the larvae can subsist on a diet solely of polystyrene (Styrofoam).

Species include:
Zophobas atratus
Zophobas batavorum
Zophobas laticollis
Zophobas morio
Zophobas rugipes

References

Tenebrionidae genera
Tenebrioninae